Plešivica is a small village in the Municipality of Žužemberk in southeastern Slovenia. The area is part of the historical region of Lower Carniola. The municipality is now included in the Southeast Slovenia Statistical Region.

Name
The name of the settlement was changed from Pleševica to Plešivica in 1988.

Church

The local church, built on a hill east of the settlement, was dedicated to Saint Catherine and was first mentioned in written documents dating to 1526. It was burned down by the Partisans in 1943.

References

External links

Plešivica at Geopedia

Populated places in the Municipality of Žužemberk